Harry Obeney (born 9 March 1938) is an English former professional footballer who played as a centre forward/wing half.

Career
A full back with Briggs Sports, Obeney signed for West Ham United in 1956 and made his full professional appearance in 1957 in a game against Notts County. His next appearance came nearly two years later. In 1959, with West Ham seeking a replacement for the injured Vic Keeble, Obeney was converted to playing as a centre forward.

Making only 30 appearances, in all competitions, for The Hammers, including West Ham's record home win against Everton; a 4–0 win in February 1961 in which Obeney scored twice, he was allowed to leave and joined Millwall in 1961. He made 75 appearances for The Lions before a short spell with Colchester United, Southern League club Dover, before making over four hundred appearances for Romford. Obeney finished his career with Aveley.

Obeney was granted a testimonial by Romford against West Ham United on 21 October 1970.

References

1938 births
Living people
Footballers from Bethnal Green
English footballers
West Ham United F.C. players
Millwall F.C. players
Colchester United F.C. players
Romford F.C. players
Aveley F.C. players
English Football League players
Association football forwards
Dover F.C. players
Briggs Sports F.C. players